Jango is a 1984 Brazilian documentary film directed by Sílvio Tendler.

Content summary
The film traces the life of João Goulart, 24th President of Brazil, who was deposed by a military-led coup on March 31, 1964 after he proposed a broad program of reforms in areas such as land, education and elections. Goulart was popularly known as "Jango", therefore the title of the film, released exactly 20 years after the coup. Goulart's life is reproduced through archive footage and interviews with important political icons such as Afonso Arinos, Leonel Brizola, Celso Furtado, Frei Betto and Magalhães Pinto, among others. The film was promoted under the suggestive tagline "Como, quando e por que se derruba um presidente" ("How, when and why a President is overthrown").

The documentary captures the effervescence of Brazilian politics of the early 1960s under the context of Cold War. Jango narrates exhaustively the details of the coup and extends itself to the first resistance movements against the dictatorship, ending with the death of the President in exile on Argentina and images of his funeral, which were originally forbidden by the military regime.

The film is narrated by José Wilker and the original score was composed by Milton Nascimento and Wagner Tiso, while historian Denise Goulart, Jango's only daughter, was one of its associate producers.

Box office
According to the Ministry of Culture of Brazil, Jango took over half a million people to the movie theaters, becoming the sixth highest grossing documentary of Brazilian cinema. Other two films directed by Tendler, O Mundo Mágico dos Trapalhões and Anos JK (about Juscelino Kubitschek, of whom Goulart was Vice-President), are respectively the first and fourth films on the list.

Awards 
Jango received the Golden Daisy Award for Best Documentary Feature from the National Conference of Brazilian Bishops. It also received three awards at the Gramado Film Festival and the Special Jury Prize at the Havana Film Festival.

See also 
 List of films depicting Latin American military dictatorships

References

External links 
 

1984 documentary films
1984 films
Brazilian documentary films
Documentary films about Brazilian politicians
Documentary films about historical events
Films about Brazilian military dictatorship
1980s Portuguese-language films
Documentary films about Latin American military dictatorships
Biographical films about presidents of Brazil
Films scored by Wagner Tiso